Please, Don't Bury Me Alive! is a 1976 independent film directed by and starring Efraín Gutiérrez and written by Sabino Garza. It is considered to be the first Chicano feature film. In its first four months of showing, the film made $300,000 at the local box offices where it was shown.

Please, Don't Bury Me Alive! was considered lost since 1980 following Gutiérrez's departure from the film industry. The film was "re-discovered" by University of California, Los Angeles professor Chon Noriega in 1996. Noriega, the UCLA Film and Television Archive, and the UCLA Chicano Studies Research Center then restored and re-released the film.

In 2014, the film was selected for preservation in the United States National Film Registry by the Library of Congress as being "culturally, historically, or aesthetically significant".

Plot 

The events take place in San Antonio, Texas in the spring of 1972, where the young protagonist Alejandro Hernandez (played by director Efraín Gutiérrez), buries an elder brother killed in the Vietnam War. The young unemployed Chicano, a petty criminal, is entrapped in a heroin deal by law enforcement officials, receiving a 10-year sentence. An Anglo youth, convicted of  a similar sentence, is given probation. The judge who sentences Alejandro is revealed as the same person who presided over the funeral of the young man’s brother. Chronologically, the film links the release date of the protagonist with the release of the film in 1976.

Budget
Filmed over a four-year period, the production cost $60,000, and grossed $300,000 in Spanish language theaters in the Southwestern United States.

Preservation
Preserved from a 16mm print as part of the Chicano Cinema Recovery Project.

Footnotes

References
Noreiga, Chon A. 2004. Please Don’t Bury Me Alive, 1977. UCLA Film and Television Archive: 12th Festival of Preservation, July 22-August 21, 2004. Festival guest publication.

External links 
 

1976 films
United States National Film Registry films
1970s rediscovered films
1976 independent films